Associazione Italiana Pneumologi Ospedalieri is the professional organization for accreditation of pulmonology (pneumology) from pulmonologists to respiratory therapists in Italy.

References

Pulmonology and respiratory therapy organizations
Medical and health organisations based in Italy